Johnson Smith may refer to:

People
 Geoffrey Johnson Smith (1924–2010), British politician
 Johnson C. Smith, namesake of Johnson C. Smith University
 Alfred Johnson Smith, founder of the Johnson Smith Company
 Lisa Johnson Smith, a host of the BET talk show Teen Summit

Places
 Johnson C. Smith University, Charlotte, North Carolina
 Linda Johnson Smith Soccer Stadium,  Worcester, Massachusetts

Other
 Johnson Smith Company, an American mail-order company
 Johnson Smith Company, an album by the Boston Chinks on Goner Records

See also
 Johnson (disambiguation)
 Smith (disambiguation)
 John Smith (disambiguation)